Kirsten Tackmann (born 24 September 1960) is a German politician. Born in Schmalkalden, Thuringia, she represents The Left. Kirsten Tackmann has served as a member of the Bundestag from the state of Brandenburg since 2005.

Life 
After visiting the POS Georg Schumann in Berlin-Lichtenberg, Kirsten Tackmann completed an apprenticeship as a chemical laboratory assistant with A-levels at VEB Berlin-Chemie from 1977 to 1980. She then began studying veterinary medicine at the Humboldt University of Berlin, which she completed in 1986 with a license to practice veterinary medicine. Kirsten Tackmann then became a research assistant at the State Institute for Epizootiology and Epizootic Disease Research, where she is still employed today by its successor, the Federal Research Institute for Animal Viral Diseases. In 1993, she received her doctorate (Dr. med. vet.) from the Humboldt University of Berlin with a thesis on the immune response to Cysticercus bovis infestation under experimental and natural pathogen exposure with special emphasis on serological diagnostics using ELISA. She became member of the bundestag after the 2005 German federal election. She is a member of the Committee for Food and Agriculture. In June 2020, Tackmann announced that she will not be reelect in 2021 German federal election.

References

External links 

  
 Bundestag biography 

1960 births
Living people
Members of the Bundestag for Brandenburg
Female members of the Bundestag
21st-century German women politicians
Members of the Bundestag 2017–2021
Members of the Bundestag 2013–2017
Members of the Bundestag 2009–2013
Members of the Bundestag 2005–2009
Members of the Bundestag for The Left